Emanuel Giniki Gisamoda (born 18 May 1988) is a Tanzanian long-distance runner.

In 2017, he competed in the senior men's race at the 2017 IAAF World Cross Country Championships held in Kampala, Uganda. He finished in 41st place.

In 2019, he competed in the senior men's race at the 2019 IAAF World Cross Country Championships held in Aarhus, Denmark. He finished in 109th place.

References

External links 
 

Living people
1988 births
Place of birth missing (living people)
Tanzanian male long-distance runners
Tanzanian male cross country runners